This is the discography of American folk group Peter, Paul and Mary.

Albums

Studio albums

Children's albums

Live albums

Compilation albums

Video albums

EPs

Singles

Notes

References 

Discographies of American artists
Folk music discographies